Shingli Payeen is a village of Battagram District in Khyber-Pakhtunkhwa province of Pakistan. It is part of Peshora Union Council and lies within Battagram Tehsil and is located about Five kilometres from the district headquarters Battagram along the Shahrah-e-Resham (Karakoram Hwy) or silk route.

 Anis Ur Rahman
 Battagram District
 Battagram Tehsil
 Deshiwal
 Khyber-Pakhtunkhwa

Villages in Khyber Pakhtunkhwa
Battagram District